Antoni Reig Ventura (València 1932), known as Rovellet because his father was Rovell from Dénia, was a professional Escala i corda Valencian pilota variant player. In recognition of his mastery, he is one of only five pilotaris with a picture on Pelayo trinquet's Honor Gallery.  He has also had a street in Valencia named after him.

His career began when he was only 15; two years later he played against Juliet d'Alginet, the number one of that time.

For many years this was the maximum level match any trinquet could host. When Juliet retired, Rovellet became the new number one until Eusebio appeared, in the 1960s.

He retired in 1979, some years after his best, but without being forced to ask for a punter partner, that is, he and a mitger player were strong enough to play levelled matches against other good duos or average trios.

Rovellet was admired for his stylistic and elegant movements, but also because he always acted as a gentleman.

Trophies 
 Winner of the Campionat Nacional d'Escala i Corda 1970

References

External links
Rovellet in Ondara documentary of Canal Nou with images of the NO-DO. 

1932 births
Living people
Sportspeople from Valencia
Pilotaris from the Valencian Community